A calendar is used to display dates and related information, usually in a table format. Calendars are used to plan future events and keep track of appointments, and so a typical calendar will include days of the week, week numbering, months, public holidays and clock changes. Printed calendars also often contain additional information relevant for specific groups – for instance, a Christian liturgical calendar will show holy days and liturgical colours, while a calendar for amateur astronomers will highlight phases of the moon, conjunctions and eclipses. Alongside their practical uses, calendars have taken on a decorative purpose, offering an easy way to introduce regularly changing artwork to a space, and have even influenced art and sexuality by popularizing the pin-up style.

History

Ancient documents and inscriptions, such as those from Rome and China, include early forms of calendars. Printing gave rise to many related types of publication which track dates, of which calendars are just one. The modern calendar evolved alongside others such as almanacs, which collected religious, cultural, meteorological, astronomical and astrological information in a table format; practica, which gave astrological predictions for the year ahead; and diaries, which were for personal and professional use. The introduction of broadside printing allowed a calendar to be printed on a single large sheet of paper, differentiating the basic calendar from more detailed diaries and practica. In the absence of accurate clocks, calendars doubled as timekeeping aids - by noting the times of sunrise and moonrise, calendars helped farmers tell the time while in the fields.

Decorative calendars

Alongside their practical use, calendars have developed into a decorative item. Typically, each page will include a new image, which may be related to the season. Common subjects include landscapes, automobiles, wildlife, male or female models and popular culture. Businesses frequently give wall calendars branded with their names and contact information away for free to customers as promotional merchandise.

An especially influential type of calendar is the nude calendar or pin-up calendar - a calendar containing images of either scantily-clad or naked models. Some are essentially pornographic in nature, but a more recent evolution is calendars featuring people in comic situations and published for charity.

Gallery 
There are many types of calendar, serving a wide variety of uses.

References

Calendars
Stationery